Patrick F. O'Reilly was an Irish politician. A solicitor, he was elected to Seanad Éireann by the Cultural and Educational Panel at 1951 Seanad election. He lost his seat at the 1954 Seanad election.

References

Year of birth missing
Year of death missing
Members of the 7th Seanad
Irish solicitors
Independent members of Seanad Éireann